Alexander Faltsetas (born 4 July 1987) is a Swedish footballer who plays for BK Häcken as a midfielder.

Career
Faltsetas started out playing as a child in the Gothenburg based club Västra Frölunda and stayed with them until 2009 when he signed with Superettan side FC Trollhättan after a trial.

He initially started out as an attacking midfielder in Trollhättan but gradually moved back to a more defensive role where he had enough success that Allsvenskan club IFK Göteborg signed him the following year. There he played 19 games in his first season, but saw his playing time reduced to one substitute appearance his second year. Due to the lack of playing time he was loaned to IK Brage in Superettan. Brage wanted to keep him after the season but he instead chose to sign with Gefle IF.

His contract with Gefle ended after the 2013 season and when manager Per Olsson made the move to Djurgårdens IF at the start of 2014 he brought his "favourite player" Faltsetas with him to the new club on a three-year deal.

Personal life
Faltsetas has a Greek father. His favourite Greek football club is PAOK from his father's hometown Thessaloniki.

References

External links

Eliteprospects profile

1987 births
Living people
Association football midfielders
IFK Göteborg players
IK Brage players
Gefle IF players
Djurgårdens IF Fotboll players
BK Häcken players
Allsvenskan players
Superettan players
Sweden youth international footballers
Swedish footballers
Swedish people of Greek descent
Footballers from Gothenburg